Père Fouettard is a character who accompanies Saint Nicholas on his rounds during Saint Nicholas Day (6 December) dispensing lumps of coal and/or beatings to naughty children while St. Nicholas gives gifts to the well behaved. He is known mainly in the far north and eastern regions of France, in the south of Belgium, and in French-speaking Switzerland, although similar characters exist all over Europe (see Companions of Saint Nicholas). This "Whipping Father" was said to bring a whip with him to spank all of the naughty children who misbehaved.

Origin
The most popular story about the origin of Père Fouettard was first told about the year 1252. An innkeeper (or a butcher in other versions) captures three boys who appear to be wealthy and on their way to enroll in a religious boarding school. Along with his wife, he kills the children in order to rob them. One gruesome version tells that they drug the children, slit their throats, cut them into pieces, and stew them in a barrel. St. Nicholas discovers the crime and resurrects the children. After this, Père Fouettard repents and becomes St. Nicholas' partner. A slightly different version of this story claims that St. Nicholas forced Père Fouettard to become his assistant as a punishment for his crimes.

Another story states that during the Siege of Metz (a city in Eastern France) in 1552, an effigy of king Charles V was burned and dragged through the city. Meanwhile, an association of tanners created a grotesque character (also a tanner) armed with a whip and bound in chains who punished children. After Metz was liberated, the charred effigy of Charles V and the character created by the tanners somehow assimilated into what is now known as Père Fouettard. Events surrounding the city's liberation and the burning of the effigy coincided with the passage of St. Nicholas, hence Père Fouettard became his "bad cop" counterpart.

In the 1930s, Père Fouettard appeared in the United States under the translated name Father Flog or Spanky. Although almost identical to the original French personification, Father Flog had nothing to do with Christmas and also had a female accomplice named Mother Flog. The two doled out specific punishments for specific childhood crimes (e.g. cutting out the tongue for lying).

Appearance
The most common depiction of Père Fouettard is of a man with a sinister face dressed in dark robes with scraggly unkempt hair and a long beard. He is armed with a whip, a large stick, or bundles of switches. Some incarnations of the character have him wearing a wicker backpack in which children can be placed and carried away. Sometimes he merely carries a large bundle of sticks on his back.

Père Fouettard in popular culture
 Jacques Dutronc's song La Fille du père Noël (The daughter of Father Christmas) is about Père Fouettard's son having a crush on Santa Claus' daughter.
 Another French pop star, Alain DeLorme, mentioned him in the song "Venez Venez St. Nicolas"
 There is a restaurant named Le Père Fouettard at 9 Rue Pierre Lescot, in Paris which features "Classic Parisian Fare".
 Robert Schumann composed a piano piece in 1848 most commonly known as Knecht Ruprecht (a similar character, see Companions of Saint Nicholas), but in some cases the piece is called  Le Père Fouettard.
 Black Phoenix Alchemy Lab, a line of hand-blended perfume oils, created a limited-edition Yule scent in 2008 named Le Père Fouettard consisting of "Whip leather, coal dust, gaufrette, and black licorice."
 Père Fouettard (renamed "Gruzzlebeard" in the English translation) was the main antagonist in the animated show The Secret World of Santa Claus.

See also 
 Befana
 Belsnickel
 Krampus
 Zwarte Piet - A similar figure from Dutch folklore
 Hans von Trotha, a German knight of the 15th Century who has been transformed in folklore into a similar figure known as Hans Trapp in the Alsace region

References
3.  “Pere Fouettard.” Pere Fouettard Christmas Character - Origin, Legends, https://www.indobase.com/holidays/christmas/characters/pere-fouettard.html 

Christmas characters
Christian folklore
Santa's helpers
French folklore
Belgian folklore
Fictional servants
Fictional French people
Medieval legends
Christmas in France
Christmas in Canada
Christmas in Belgium
Companions of Saint Nicholas